SpVgg Ansbach is a German football club from the city of Ansbach, Bavaria.

The club's greatest league success came in 2001, when it earned promotion to the tier-three Regionalliga Süd, where it lasted for only one season. They returned to the Regionalliga in 2022. SpVgg Ansbach qualified for the German Cup on three occasions, reaching the second round once, in 1980–81.

History
The club roots go back to the 1909 formation of a football department within the gymnastics club Turnverein 1860 Ansbach. The team disappeared for a period of three years during World War I but was re-formed in 1917 as the independent club Sportverein 1909 Ansbach by the footballers of TV and 1. FC 1912 Ansbach. A highlight of the club's early years came in 1928 with the capture of the A-Klasse Mittelfranken title and subsequent promotion playoff win over 1. FC Zirndorf that advanced the club to the second tier Kreisliga where they would compete until 1937.

Following World War II most organizations in the country, including sports and football clubs, were dissolved by occupying Allied authorities. The club was re-established in 1945 as Sportverein Ansbach out of the membership of a number of local sports clubs. On 30 November 1948, the association was renamed Turn- und Sportverein Ansbach and, in 1951, the footballers went their own way again as Spielvereinigung 1909 Ansbach.

The team advanced to the fourth tier 2nd Amateurliga Bayern in 1953 for a single season, and after being sent down, promptly returned in 1955. They played at that level until sent down through league restructuring in the early 60s. The club qualified for DFB Pokal (German Cup) play for the first time in 1981 and advanced out of the first round by defeating FSV Pfaffenhofen 1–0. In the next round they were soundly thrashed by second-division side Stuttgarter Kickers (0:13). Ansbach returned briefly to fourth-tier play in the Landesliga Bayern-Mitte in 1985 and again qualified to participate in the opening round of the DFB Pokal the same year where they were put out 0–3 by SV Waldhof Mannheim.

SpVgg spent eleven seasons in the Landesliga with a fifth place in 1993 as its best result, but was then relegated to the Bezirksoberliga Mittelfranken in 1996. This lasted for only one season, earning promotion straight back and returning to the Landesliga as a much more competitive side.

Ansbach enjoyed their best successes to date in the late 90s as they won promotion first to the Fußball-Bayernliga (IV) in 1999, and two seasons later, to the Regionalliga Süd (III). However, they had a difficult time in the third tier, and after a 12-game winless streak and a next to last place finish, the team was sent down.

The club continued to struggle after being sent down and narrowly missed relegation in each of the next two campaigns. They were finally relegated to the Landesliga Bayern (V) after a 15th-place finish in 2004–05. Ansbach promptly rebounded and on the strength of a division title in 2006–07 and won promotion back to the Fußball-Bayernliga (IV) for three seasons, before it was relegated again in 2010.

After only being saved from relegation from the Landesliga in 2012 by a league expansion Ansbach won the Landesliga Bayern-Nordwest in 2014 and earned promotion back to the Bayernliga. After a fifteenth place in 2014–15 the club had to enter the relegation round where it lost to 1. FC Bad Kötzting and was relegated. Ansbach won its Landesliga division in the following season and was promoted back to the Bayernliga.

Honours
The club's honours:

League
 Bayernliga (IV)
 Champions: 2001
 Runners-up: 2022
 Landesliga Bayern-Mitte (V)
 Champions: 2007
 Runners-up: 1999
  Landesliga Bayern-Nordwest
 Champions: 2014, 2016
 Bezirksoberliga Mittelfranken (VI)
 Champions: 1997

Cup
 Bavarian Cup
 Runners-up: 2008

Recent managers
Recent managers of the club:

Recent seasons
The recent season-by-season performance of the club:

With the introduction of the Bezirksoberligas in 1988 as the new fifth tier, below the Landesligas, all leagues below dropped one tier. With the introduction of the Regionalligas in 1994 and the 3. Liga in 2008 as the new third tier, below the 2. Bundesliga, all leagues below dropped one tier. With the establishment of the Regionalliga Bayern as the new fourth tier in Bavaria in 2012 the Bayernliga was split into a northern and a southern division, the number of Landesligas expanded from three to five and the Bezirksoberligas abolished. All leagues from the Bezirksligas onwards were elevated one tier.

Stadium
Since 1976 the club has played its home matches at the Sportpark Ansbach which has a capacity of 5,000 (1,000 seats).

DFB Cup appearances
The club has qualified for the first round of the German Cup three times:

American football department
From 1979 to 1981, the club was home to an American football department, the Ansbach Grizzlies. The Grizzlies were a successful team during the early days of the game in Germany, reaching every German Bowl from 1979 to 1986 and winning it in 1981, 1982 and 1985. In 1981, this department however went its own way, separating from the SpVgg.

References

Sources
Grüne, Hardy (2001). Vereinslexikon. Kassel: AGON Sportverlag

External links
 Official team site  
 SpVgg Ansbach profile at Weltfussball.de  
 Das deutsche Fußball-Archiv  historical German domestic league

Football clubs in Germany
Football clubs in Bavaria
Association football clubs established in 1909
Football in Middle Franconia
1909 establishments in Germany
Ansbach